ALFA or later Alfa Romeo has made three cars named as  20/30 HP, first one 1910 4-cylinder 4-6-seater tourer, improved version 20/30 HP E in 1914 and 1921 the 20/30 HP ES Sport, a 4-seater sportscar.

The Alfa 20/30 HP

The Alfa Romeo "Torpedo" 20/30HP was the first car under the ALFA brand to formally carry the Alfa Romeo name. It was equipped with a 4250 cc sidevalve inline-four engine producing 67bhp. The car was intended for a launch amongst the upper classes of Italy, so the price was notably high- around three times that of the Ford Model T, a large sum of money when one considers the post-World War I economy.

The ALFA 20/30 HP was almost identical to the 24 HP of 1910 and was often simply called the HP 24 Serie E. The 24 HP's engine was reused completely, save for a sidechain on the camshaft to reduce noise. The vehicle was available in two body variants: A Berlina chassis and a torpedo variant.

At the outbreak of World War I on August 3, 1914, Italy declared itself neutral. ALFA plants, as such, had not been directly affected by war, or by manufacturing related to the war effort. Production numbers between 1914 and 1915 totaled 285 finished 20/30 HP models. In 1915, the production totals decreased to 95 frames for the 20/30 HP, which were only completed in 1920.

Alfa Romeo 20/30 ES Sport

The ES Sport was based on the 1914 20/30 E model, the "S" being added to emphasize the sportiness of the car. Notably, the ES had electric lights and an electric starter. The chassis was shortened from previous models as well.

Price was a major negative factor, and only 124 were ever produced. Notably, it is with the ES that Enzo Ferrari began his racing career with teammates Antonio Ascari and Ugo Sivocci.

 Engine: 4 cylinders inline
 Displacement: 4250 cc
 Power: 67 bhp at 2600 rpm
 Top speed:

Notes

References

20 30 HP
Cars introduced in 1914
1920s cars